An International Wanderers team, made up of international players from multiple countries, toured Rhodesia in 1974. They played five matches against the Rhodesia cricket team and one game in South Africa against Transvaal.

Squad
The following players played one or more matches for the International Wanderers

Tour matches

References

1974 in Rhodesia
1974 in South African sport
1972